TSV St. Otmar St. Gallen is a Swiss handball team located in St. Gallen. Their home matches are played at the Kreuzbleiche-Halle. They compete in Swiss Handball League.

Kits

Sports Hall information

Name: – Sportanlage Kreuzbleiche
City: – St. Gallen
Capacity: – 4200
Address: – 	Bogenstrasse 10. 9000 St. Gallen, Switzerland

Accomplishments

Swiss Handball League: 
Winners (7) : 1971, 1973, 1974, 1981, 1982, 1986, 2001
Swiss Handball Cup: 
Winners (4) : 1980, 1981, 2000, 2001
European Champions Cup: 
Runner-Up (1) : 1982
EHF Cup: 
Semifinalist (2) : 1988, 2009
EHF Challenge Cup: 
Semifinalist (1) : 2005

European record

Team

Current squad
Squad for the 2021–22 season

Goalkeepers
1  Becir Perazic
 31  Aurel Bringolf
Left wingers
8  Jan Gwerder
 26  Severin Kaiser
Right wingers
6  Ramon Hörler
7  David Fricker
Line players
 13  Benjamin Geisser
 28  Clemens Gangl
 30  Antonio Juric

Left backs
 10  Frédéric Wustner
 17  Noah Haas
 19  Ariel Pietrasik
Central backs
9  Andrija Pendic
 34  Filip Maros
Right backs
 11  Vuk Lakićević
 15  Dominic Jurilj

External links
 
 

Swiss handball clubs
Sport in St. Gallen (city)